Fred McLeod may refer to:
 Fred McLeod (golfer)
 Fred McLeod (sportscaster)
 Fred McLeod (rugby union)